Ulrich Reimers (born 23 March 1952 in Hildesheim) is an electrical engineer and is regarded as a pioneer of digital television. The International Electrotechnical Commission (IEC) elected him for its Hall of Fame of most important personalities.

Education
Reimers studied electrical engineering with specialization on telecommunications and radio-frequency engineering and obtained his doctoral degree at the Technische Universität Braunschweig. After seven years at the Robert Bosch GmbH where Reimers worked in the area of television devices, he became technical director of the Norddeutscher Rundfunk (North German Broadcasting). From 1993 to 2020, he was the director of the Institut für Nachrichtentechnik (Institute for Telecommunications Engineering) at the TU Braunschweig. From 1990 to 2002 he was the president of the Fernseh- und Kinotechnische Gesellschaft (FKTG).

Reimers is a board member of the Deutsche TV-Plattform, president of the „Technical Module“ in the „DVB Project“ and a member of the  Kommission zur Ermittlung des Finanzbedarfs der Rundfunkanstalten (KEF) (commission for determining the financial requirements of the broadcasting companies). In 2012 he obtained the Niedersächsischer Staatspreis (Lower Saxony State Prize).

Works
 DVB (Digital Video Broadcasting). Springer Verlag, Berlin September 2004; 2. Auflage, .

References

External links 
 
 CV at ifn.ing.tu-bs.de
 Portrait at Eduard-Rhein-Stiftung

Living people
1952 births
German electrical engineers
Technical University of Braunschweig alumni
People from Hildesheim
Engineers from Lower Saxony